Radio Georgia was the international broadcasting service of Georgian Radio, now known as Georgian Public Broadcaster, the public broadcaster in Georgia. It was closed in 2005.

Radio Georgia broadcast on the shortwave radio bands in English, German and Russian.

References

External links
Recording of Radio Georgia interval signal and announcement

International broadcasters
Radio stations in Georgia (country)

Radio stations disestablished in 2005 
Defunct radio stations
Defunct mass media in Georgia (country)